Dev Kohli (2 November 1942) is an Indian Hindustani poet and lyricist. He penned hundreds of songs in Bollywood films and churned out numerous hit songs such as Maaye Ni Maaye, Yeh Kaali Kaali Aankhen, Geet Gaata Hoon,O Saki Saki etc.

Early life
Kohli was born in a Sikh family in Rawalpindi, Pakistan. After partition, his family moved to Dehradun, India. He studied in Shri Giri Nanak Dev Guru Maharaj College. His father died in 1958.

Career
Kohli moved to Mumbai in 1964. He started searching for work in films. He started his career in 1969 with the film Gunda. His first breakthrough came with "Geet Gaata Hoon Main" in the film Laal Patthar (1971). The song became a huge success. But it didn’t help his career much. He wrote lyrics for several films in the 1970s and 1980s, but went unnoticed. He again draw attention with Maine Pyaar Kiya (1989) when songs like Aate Jaate Hanste Gaate, Kabootar Ja Ja Ja, Aaja Shaam Hone Aayee, Maine Pyar Kiya and Kahe Toh Se Sajna became hits. In the 1990s, He developed a remarkable collaboration with Anu Malik, for whom he wrote songs like "Yeh Kaali Kaali Aankhen" in Baazigar (1993), "Dekho Dekho Jaanam Hum" in Ishq (1997) etc.  
In November 1998, former vice-president of political party Bharatiya Janata Yava Morcha, Rakesh Sethi filed a case against Dev Kohli and singer Poornima for using vulgar language in the song "Ab Tak Hai Puri Azaadi" of the film Kudrat (1998). A local court issued a non-bailable warrant against both on 1 April 2003.

Awards and nominations

References

External links 
 

Indian male poets
Indian lyricists
Hindi-language lyricists
Indian male songwriters
Indian Sikhs
Living people
1942 births
20th-century Indian poets
Poets from Uttar Pradesh
20th-century Indian male writers